The West and Central African Rift System (WCARS) is a rift system composed of two coeval Cretaceous rift sub-systems, the West African Rift sub-system (WAS) and the Central African Rift sub-system (CAS). These are genetically related, but are physically separated and show structural differences. The Logone Birni Basin constitutes a transitional area between the two sub-systems.

The WCARS is older than the East African Rift System.

References

Mesozoic rifts and grabens
Structural geology
Plate tectonics
Cretaceous geology